The 2018 SWF Scottish Cup was the national cup competition in Scottish women's football for that calendar year. All teams in the Scottish Women's Football League and SWPL 1 & 2 were eligible to enter.

Quarter-finals
Teams in Bold advanced to the semi-finals.

Sources:

Semi-finals
Teams in Bold advanced to the final.

Sources:

Final
The final was played on 4 November 2018 at Firhill Stadium in Glasgow. A new trophy was unveiled a few days prior to the event.

Hibernian won the final 8–0 against Motherwell. It was their third Scottish Cup win in a row.

References

Scottish Women's Cup
Scottish Women's Cup